Dibīr (Middle Persian for "secretary/scribe") was the title of one of the four classes in the society of Sasanian Iran, which played a major role in Sasanian politics. The term fell out of favour under the Umayyad Caliphate, when Persian was replaced with Arabic as the administrative language. The title again became an administrative title as New Persian form dabīr when Persian was revived as the language of administration under the Samanids and Ghaznavids. The title was thereafter used for decades till the Safavid period, when it was replaced by the title of monshi. However, dabīr was in use once again under the Qajar dynasty.

Sources 
 

Persian words and phrases
Government of the Samanid Empire
Government of the Sasanian Empire
Social class in the Sasanian Empire
Government of the Ghaznavid Empire